Beykoz Spor Kulübü Derneği, today known for sponsorship reasons as TTNet Beykoz, is a Turkish sports club based in Beykoz, Istanbul. Their home arena is Beykoz Sport Hall.

Beykoz was founded in 1908. Team colours are black and yellow. The Beykoz football team played in the Turkish First League for eight seasons. The team played in the Third League as Beykozspor 1908 AŞ, which is the fourth level of Turkish football, and were promoted to the Second League in the 2007–08 season as champions. The first American basketball player in Turkey, Clev Cristy, was player of Beykoz in the 1961–62 season.

The team is sponsored by Türk Telekom Internet Service.

The basketball section of the club have won the Turkish Basketball Championship in 1946.

League Participations for Basketball
 First Level: 1988–1990 (as Sümerbank Beykozspor), 2005–2008
 Second Level: ?, 2008–2011
 Regional (Third) Level: 2011–

Honours for Basketball
 Turkish Basketball Championship
 Winners (1): 1946

League Participations for Football
 Turkish Super League: 1958–66
 TFF First League: 1966–71, 1972–79, 1980–84, 1986–91
 TFF Second League: 1971–72, 1979–80, 1984–86, 1991–01, 2007–2009
 TFF Third League: 2001–07, 2009–11
 Turkish Regional Amateur League: 2011–13
 Istanbul Super Amateur League: 2013–

Note: Beykozspor finished the Istanbul Super Amateur League 3rd Group in 11th place and relegated to Istanbul First Amateur League. But, they took place of İstanbul PTT and became Beykozspor 1908. They finished SAL 7th Group as 4th in 2014–15 season

References

External links
Beykoz 1908
Supporters' web site
TBLStat.net Team Profile 

Sport in Beykoz
Basketball teams in Turkey
Football clubs in Turkey
Basketball teams established in 1928
1908 establishments in the Ottoman Empire
Süper Lig clubs

tr:Beykoz Basketbol Takımı
diq:Beykozspor 1908